Church of Ecce Homo may refer to:

 Convent of the Sisters of Zion, a convent in the Old City of Jerusalem whose site includes the Church of Ecce Homo 
 Ecce Homo, Alcamo, a former church in Alcamo, Sicily